The Ferro-Grumley Award is an annual literary award, presented by Publishing Triangle and the Ferro-Grumley Foundation to a book deemed the year's best work of LGBT fiction. The award is presented in memory of writers Robert Ferro and Michael Grumley. It was co-founded in 1988 by Stephen Greco who continues to direct it as of 2022.

First awarded in 1990, separate awards were presented for gay and lesbian fiction until 2008 when the awards were merged into a single award.

On two occasions, the award has been won by works that were not conventional literary fiction. In 1994, journalist John Berendt won the award for his non-fiction novel Midnight in the Garden of Good and Evil, and in 2009, cartoonist Alison Bechdel won the award for her comic strip anthology The Essential Dykes to Watch Out For.

Awards

Gay male fiction
 1990 — Dennis Cooper, Closer
 1991 — Allen Barnett, The Body and Its Dangers
 1992 — Melvin Dixon, Vanishing Rooms
 1993 — Randall Kenan, Let the Dead Bury Their Dead
 1994 — John Berendt, Midnight in the Garden of Good and Evil
 1995 — Mark Merlis, American Studies
 1996 — Felice Picano, Like People in History
 1997 — Andrew Holleran, The Beauty of Men
 1998 — Colm Tóibín, The Story of the Night
 1999 — Michael Cunningham, The Hours
 2000 — Paul Russell, The Coming Storm
 2001 — Edmund White, The Married Man
 2002 — David Ebershoff, The Rose City
 2003 — Jamie O'Neill, At Swim, Two Boys
 2004 — Trebor Healey, Through It Came Bright Colors
 2005 — Adam Berlin, Belmondo Style
 2006 — Barry McCrea, The First Verse
 2007 — Christopher Bram, Exiles in America
 2008 — Peter Cameron, Someday This Pain Will Be Useful to You

Lesbian fiction
 1990 — Ruthann Robson, Eye of the Hurricane
 1991 — Cherry Muhanji, Her
 1992 — Blanche McCrary Boyd, The Revolution of Little Girls
 1993 — Dorothy Allison, Bastard Out of Carolina
 1994 — Jeanette Winterson, Written on the Body
 1995 — Heather Lewis, House Rules
 1996 — Sarah Schulman, Rat Bohemia
 1997 — Persimmon Blackbridge, Sunnybrook
 1998 — Elana Dykewomon, Beyond the Pale
 1999 — Patricia Powell, The Pagoda
 2000 — Judy Doenges, What She Left Me
 2001 — Sarah Waters, Affinity
 2002 — Emma Donoghue, Slammerkin
 2003 — Carol Anshaw, Lucky in the Corner
 2004 — Nina Revoyr, Southland
 2005 — Stacey D'Erasmo, A Seahorse Year
 2006 — Patricia Grossman, Brian in Three Seasons
 2007 — Lisa Carey, Every Visible Thing
 2008 — Ali Liebegott, The IHOP Papers

Merged award
 2009 — Alison Bechdel, The Essential Dykes to Watch Out For
 2010 — Sebastian Stuart, The Hour Between
 2011 — Michael Sledge, The More I Owe You
 2012 — Paul Russell, The Unreal Life of Sergei Nabokov
 2013 — Trebor Healey, A Horse Named Sorrow
 2014 — Sara Farizan, If You Could Be Mine
 2015 — Bernardine Evaristo, Mr. Loverman
 2016 — Michael Golding, A Poet of the Invisible World
 2017 — Cathleen Schine, They May Not Mean To, But They Do
 2018 — Alistair McCartney, The Disintegrations
 2019 — John R. Gordon, Drapetomania
 2020 — Ocean Vuong, On Earth We're Briefly Gorgeous
 2021 — Juli Delgado Lopera, Fiebre Tropical
 2022 — Anthony Veasna So, Afterparties

References

External links
Publishing Triangle Awards

Triangle Awards
American fiction awards
Awards established in 1990